In mathematics, a field  is pseudo algebraically closed if it satisfies certain properties which hold for algebraically closed fields.  The concept was introduced by James Ax in 1967.

Formulation

A field K is pseudo algebraically closed (usually abbreviated by PAC) if one of the following equivalent conditions holds:

Each absolutely irreducible variety  defined over  has a -rational point.
Each absolutely irreducible polynomial  has infinitely many -rational points.

Examples 

 Algebraically closed fields and separably closed fields are always PAC.
Pseudo-finite fields and hyper-finite fields are PAC.
 A non-principal ultraproduct of distinct finite fields is (pseudo-finite and hence) PAC.  Ax deduces this from the Riemann hypothesis for curves over finite fields.
 Infinite algebraic extensions of finite fields are PAC.
 The PAC Nullstellensatz. The absolute Galois group  of a field  is profinite, hence compact, and hence equipped with a normalized Haar measure. Let  be a countable Hilbertian field and let  be a positive integer. Then for almost all -tuples , the fixed field of the subgroup generated by the automorphisms is PAC. Here the phrase "almost all" means "all but a set of measure zero".  (This result is a consequence of Hilbert's irreducibility theorem.)
 Let K be the maximal totally real Galois extension of the rational numbers and i the square root of −1. Then K(i) is PAC.

Properties
 The Brauer group of a PAC field is trivial, as any Severi–Brauer variety has a rational point.
 The absolute Galois group of a PAC field is a projective profinite group; equivalently, it has cohomological dimension at most 1.
 A PAC field of characteristic zero is C1.

References 

 

Algebraic geometry
Field (mathematics)